Odysseas Kordelio Football Club is a Greek football club, based in Eleftherio-Kordelio, Evosmos, Thessaloniki. It was founded in 1947 by Ulysses Xylene, and participated in the local league B and C class E.P.S.M until 1977. It played a total of 8 years in the professional categories of Greece (1 time in the national B and 7 times the national C).

External links
Official website 

Football clubs in Central Macedonia
1947 establishments in Greece